Road in the Woods is a 19th-century painting by French painter Constant Troyon. Done in oil on canvas, the work depicts two dirt roads heading through a wooded area. Troyon, a member of the Barbizon school, was inspire to render woods in such a way by 17th century Dutch landscape painters. Road in the Woods is in the collection of the Metropolitan Museum of Art.

References 

1840s paintings
Paintings in the collection of the Metropolitan Museum of Art